The 2000 Men's Pan American Cup was the first edition of the Men's Pan American Cup, the quadrennial men's international field hockey championship of the Americas organized by the Pan American Hockey Federation. It was held from 22 June to 2 July 2000 in Havana, Cuba. The tournament doubled as the qualifier to the 2002 Hockey World Cup to be held in Kuala Lumpur, Malaysia. The winner would qualify directly while the teams ranked between 2nd and 5th would have the chance to obtain one of seven berths at the World Cup Qualifier in Edinburgh, Scotland.

Cuba won the tournament for the first time after defeating Canada 2–1 in the final, earning an automatic berth at the 2002 Hockey World Cup.

Teams

Results
All times are Cuba Daylight Time (UTC-04:00)

First round

Pool A

Pool B

Ninth to eleventh place classification

7–9th place semi-final

Ninth place game

Fifth to eighth place classification

5–8th place semi-finals

Seventh place game

Fifth place game

First to fourth place classification

Semi-finals

Third place game

Final

Final standings

 Qualified for the 2002 World Cup

 Qualified for the 2001 World Cup Qualifier

External links
Official website

Men's Pan American Cup
Pan American Cup
Pan American Cup
International field hockey competitions hosted by Cuba
Pan American Cup
Pan American Cup
Sports competitions in Havana
20th century in Havana
Pan American Cup